paiN Gaming is a Brazilian esports organisation founded in March 2010 by Arthur "PAADA" Zarzur, a former professional Dota 2 player. It has a League of Legends team competing in the Campeonato Brasileiro de League of Legends (CBLOL), Brazil's top professional league for the game.

paiN Gaming is one of the oldest esports organisations in Brazil and has a higher following on social media than many traditional sports clubs. It was also the first esports organization in Latin America to have a gaming house and the first in the world to have a fan membership program, the size of which rivals that of Series A association football teams.

History 
paiN Gaming was founded in March 2010 by Arthur "PAADA" Zarzur, a former professional Dota 2 player. Its inaugural League of Legends roster consisted of players from CNB e-Sports Club and GameWise. The organization has since expanded into the professional scenes of Clash Royale, CS:GO, Dota 2, Free Fire and PlayerUnknown's Battlegrounds.

League of Legends

Current roster

Honours 
Domestic

League
 Campeonato Brasileiro de League of Legends (CBLOL)
Winners (3): 2013, 2015 Summer, 2021 Spring
 Brazilian Challenger Circuit (BRCC)
 Winners (1): 2018 Summer
Cup
 Superliga ABCDE
Winners (1): 2019

Free Fire 
On August 15, 2019, paiN announced its entry to Free Fire by purchasing the NewX Gaming team.

Current roster

References 

2010 establishments in Brazil
Esports teams based in Brazil
Esports teams established in 2010
Campeonato Brasileiro de League of Legends teams
Tom Clancy's Rainbow Six Siege teams